Not to be confused with David Foote Rivers

David Lee Rivers (born January 20, 1965) is an American former professional basketball player and coach. A 5’11”(1.84 m ) tall point guard, he reached star status in the EuroLeague, mainly while playing with Olympiacos, under head coach Dušan Ivković. Rivers played 3 seasons in the NBA, one with the Los Angeles Lakers (1988–89) and two more with the Los Angeles Clippers (1989–90, 1991–92). He played college basketball at the University of Notre Dame.

Early years 
Rivers grew up in Jersey City, and played high school basketball under Bob Hurley, at powerhouse St. Anthony High School. He contributed to the team winning three State Championships and became the school's first player to be invited to the McDonald's All-American Game (1984).

Rivers was teammates at St. Anthony with John Valentin.

College career
Rivers accepted a basketball scholarship from the University of Notre Dame, to play under head coach Digger Phelps. As a freshman, he was named a starter at point guard. As a sophomore, he contributed to the team reaching the Sweet 16 in the NCAA Division I men's basketball tournament.

On August 24, 1986, before the start of the season, he was a passenger in a van being driven by former college teammate Ken Barlow, returning to an apartment they shared after working a summer job with a caterer business, when the vehicle overturned and went into a ditch, after trying to avoid an oncoming car. Barlow had minor cuts, but Rivers suffered a life-threatening 15-inch abdominal cut, that he was able to recover from to play in 32 college games that season.

He was named the team's MVP for four consecutive seasons and was a team co-captain for three straight seasons. He received third-team All-American in 1986–87, and second-team honors in '87–88

He currently ranks fourth in school history, in scoring with 2,058 points, and second in Notre Dame history in assists (586). He also ranks second all-time in steals (201), and steals average (1.7 steals per game), second in games started (116), fourth in assists average (5.0 assists per game) and three-point field goal percentage (.406), ninth in games played (118), 11th all-time in three-point field goals made (67), and 13th in three-point field goals attempted (165). He was selected to the 1987 NCAA Championship All-Regional team. He earned four monograms while a member of the Fighting Irish.

Professional playing career

National Basketball Association
Rivers was selected by the Los Angeles Lakers in the first round (25th overall) of the 1988 NBA draft, after the player they were targeting (Brian Shaw), was selected one choice before. As a rookie he played in 47 regular season games, averaging 2.9 points and 2.3 assists per game, and 6 playoff games, averaging 2.5 points and 1 assist per game. The team eventually lost in the NBA Finals against the Detroit Pistons.

Rivers was selected by the Minnesota Timberwolves in the 1989 NBA expansion draft. He was released before the start of the regular season on November 2. On November 14, 1989, he signed as a free agent with the Los Angeles Clippers. He played in 53 games (11 of them as a starter), averaging 4.2 points and 3 assists per contest. He wasn't re-signed after the season.

On September 18, 1990, he signed as a free agent with the San Antonio Spurs. He was released on October 19.

In 1990, he signed with the Tulsa Fast Breakers of the Continental Basketball Association. In December, he was placed in the injured reserve list with a sprained ankle.

On July 12, 1991, he was traded to the La Crosse Catbirds of the Continental Basketball Association, playing under coach Flip Saunders. On November 23, he signed with the Los Angeles Clippers, playing in 15 games before being released. On January 7, 1992, he was released by the Los Angeles Clippers. He returned to La Crosse and later was called up by Los Angeles Clippers, where he played 15 games of the 1991–1992 season. On December 17, he re-signed with La Crosse, where he won the league title. He averaged 27.1 points and 9.6 assists during the finals and received MVP honors.

Europe
In 1993, he signed with the Olympique Antibes of the LNB Pro A French League, where he played 2 seasons, winning the Championship in 1995.

In 1995, he signed with the Olympiacos B.C. of the Greek Basket League, winning the title in 1996. In 1996–1997, he contributed to the team winning the Greek Basketball Cup, the Greek Basket League and the EuroLeague (the second time a Greek club won the trophy), where he faced the FC Barcelona Bàsquet and was named EuroLeague Final Four MVP, averaging 27 points per game in the two Final Four games in Rome. During that season, Rivers he averaged in the EuroLeague, 17.2 points, 3.4 assists, 3.4 rebounds, and 2.0 steals in 37.9 minutes per game, in 23 games played. At his stage of his career, he was considered one of the best basketball players in Europe. He is remembered as a legend by Olympiacos fans and he is widely considered one of the greatest players in Olympiacos history. He was also named the European Player of the Year in 1997, making him the first American ever to receive European Basketball Highest Honor.

In the 1997 off-season, Rivers left Olympiacos to join Italian League club Teamsystem Bologna, playing alongside former NBA All-star Dominique Wilkins. He averaged 12.8 points, 3.3 assists per game and contributed to the team winning the Italian Basketball Cup, receiving Co-MVP Honors with teammate Carlton Myers.

In 1998, he signed with the Tofaş of the Turkish League, where he won two Turkish League championships and two Turkish Cups, before re-joining Olympiacos for one season.

In 2000, he returned to play with the Olympiacos B.C., contributing to the team reaching the Greek Basket League Championship game, where it lost to the Panathinaikos B.C.

Although he didn't play for 2 years, he signed with the Olympique Antibes for the 2003–04 season in the second division of the LNB Pro A French League. In 2013, he was inducted into the Olympique Antibes Basketball Club Hall of Fame and had his jersey number retired.

Personal life
In 2009, he was hired as a coach by the Virtus Bologna of the Lega Basket Serie A, to assist in the development of Junior players during that season. On April 22, 2014, he was hired as an associate head coach for the Kennesaw State Owls. He is a director at Village Camps Basketball Camps in Switzerland.

Career achievements

Club titles
 CBA: 1 (with La Crosse Catbirds: 1991–92)
 French League: 1 (with Olympique Antibes: 1994–95)
 Greek League: 2 (with Olympiacos: 1995–96, 1996–97)
 Greek Cup: 1 (with Olympiacos: 1996–97)
 EuroLeague: 1 (with Olympiacos: 1996–97)
 Italian Cup: 1 (with Fortitudo Bologna: 1997–98)
 Turkish League: 2 (with Tofaş: 1998–99, 1999–00)
 Turkish Cup: 2 (with Tofaş: 1998–99, 1999–00)

References

External links
FIBA Europe profile
Euroleague.net profile
Italian League Profile 
TBLStat.net Profile

1965 births
Living people
African-American basketball players
All-American college men's basketball players
American expatriate basketball people in France
American expatriate basketball people in Greece
American expatriate basketball people in Italy
American expatriate basketball people in Turkey
American men's basketball players
Basketball players from Jersey City, New Jersey
Fortitudo Pallacanestro Bologna players
Greek Basket League players
Kennesaw State Owls men's basketball coaches
La Crosse Catbirds players
Los Angeles Clippers players
Los Angeles Lakers draft picks
Los Angeles Lakers players
McDonald's High School All-Americans
Minnesota Timberwolves expansion draft picks
Notre Dame Fighting Irish men's basketball players
Olympiacos B.C. players
Olympique Antibes basketball players
Tofaş S.K. players
Parade High School All-Americans (boys' basketball)
Point guards
Sportspeople from Jersey City, New Jersey
Tulsa Fast Breakers players
21st-century African-American people
20th-century African-American sportspeople
St. Anthony High School (New Jersey) alumni